Walter M. Schmetzer (born April 26, 1967 in Seattle, Washington) is a former U.S. soccer midfielder who played professionally in the Western Soccer Alliance and Major Indoor Soccer League.

Schmetzer grew up in Seattle, Washington where he attended Nathan Hale High School. He learned to play soccer under the tutelage of his father Walter who coached him with the Lake City Hawks youth team. Walter, a native of Germany, had played in the German Third Division before immigrating to the United States.  Schmetzer, and his twin brother Andy led Nathan Hale to the 1985 3A Washington State boys soccer championship.  After graduating in 1985, both Schmetzers, along with their older brother Brian signed with F.C. Seattle of the Western Soccer Alliance.  In 1986, he signed with the Cleveland Force of Major Indoor Soccer League (MISL).  In 1988, he moved to the Tacoma Stars of MISL.  He played two seasons with Tacoma.

References

External links
 MISL stats

1967 births
Living people
American soccer players
Cleveland Force (original MISL) players
Seattle Storm (soccer) players
Major Indoor Soccer League (1978–1992) players
Tacoma Stars players
Western Soccer Alliance players
American people of German descent
Association football midfielders